Igarka is a town in Krasnoyarsk Krai, Russia.

Igarka may also refer to:
Igarka Urban Settlement, a municipal formation which the district town of Igarka in Turukhansky District of Krasnoyarsk Krai, Russia is incorporated as
Igarka Airport (IAA/UOII), an airport in Krasnoyarsk Krai
MV Igarka, a Finnish cargo ship launched in 1983